Plasmopara helianthi f. helianthi is a plant pathogen infecting sunflowers.

References

Water mould plant pathogens and diseases
Sunflower diseases
Peronosporales
Species described in 1962